In mathematics, a uniform tree is a locally finite tree which is the universal cover of a finite graph. Equivalently, the full automorphism group G=Aut(X) of the tree, which is a locally compact topological group, is unimodular and G\X is finite. Also equivalent is the existence of a uniform X-lattice in G.

Sources 
 

Trees (graph theory)